Cecil Richard Rutt CBE (27 August 192527 July 2011) was an English Roman Catholic priest and a former Anglican bishop.

Rutt spent almost 20 years of his life serving as an Anglican missionary in South Korea, a country for which he developed a deep affection. He was perhaps the last of the line of scholar-missionaries, beginning with James Scarth Gale, Homer B. Hulbert, George Heber Jones and the Anglican bishop Mark Napier Trollope who laid the foundations of what is now known as Korean studies. Some years after he retired as an Anglican bishop, Rutt was one of several Anglicans received into the Roman Catholic Church in 1994. He was ordained a Roman Catholic priest the following year and spent the closing years of his life in Cornwall.

Early life
Rutt was the son of Cecil Rutt and Mary Hare (née Turner). He was educated at Huntingdon Grammar School, Kelham Theological College in Nottinghamshire and Pembroke College, Cambridge, from which he received his Master of Arts degree.

Anglican ministry
Rutt was made deacon as Michaelmas (29 September) 1951 and ordained priest on St Matthew's Day (21 September) 1952 — both times by Edward Wynn, Bishop of Ely, at Ely Cathedral. After a curacy at St George's Cambridge he went to South Korea as a missionary in 1954 together with Roger Tennant. In 1965 he was appointed Archdeacon of West Seoul. In June 1966 he was appointed an assistant bishop of the Diocese of Daejeon by Michael Ramsey, Archbishop of Canterbury; he was consecrated a bishop on 28 October 1966 (the Feast of SS Simon and June). In February 1968, his appointment as diocesan Bishop of Daejeon was announced. He was named a Commander of the Order of the British Empire in 1973.

Feeling that the time had come for Koreans to take charge of their portion of the Anglican Communion, in 1973 Rutt offered his resignation as Bishop of Daejeon, intending to continue serving as a simple parish priest in the country he had come to love so much. That proved to be impossible and in January 1974 he was appointed suffragan bishop of the Church of England's Diocese of Truro with the title Bishop of St Germans; He took up that post on Ascension Day (23 May) 1974; while in Cornwall he learned the Cornish language to celebrate weddings in Cornish. In October 1978 he was named Bishop of Leicester: he took up the See between his predecessor's retirement at the end of 1978 and his own enthronement on 24 March 1979.

In 1982 Rutt, who was always strongly inclined to Anglo-Catholicism, voted against the unity covenant with the Methodist, Moravian and United Reformed churches. In July 1985 he was introduced into the House of Lords. He retired on 1 October 1990 and went to live in Falmouth, in the Cornwall he had come to love. He died in his 87th year at Treliske Hospital, Truro.

Roman Catholic ministry
In September 1994, Rutt became a Roman Catholic and in June 1995 he was ordained as a Roman Catholic priest by Christopher Budd, Roman Catholic Bishop of Plymouth, at Buckfast Abbey. He spent his last years in residence at St Mary Immaculate Parish in Falmouth. In 2009 he was made a Prelate of Honour, with the title of Monsignor, by Pope Benedict XVI. He was an honorary canon of Plymouth Cathedral.

Korean studies and writings
While in Korea, from 1954 to 1974, Rutt studied in great depth the language, culture and history of Korea, as well as Classical Chinese. He was an active member of the Royal Asiatic Society Korea Branch, serving on the council, overseeing its publications and serving as its president in 1974. He published six scholarly papers in the RASKB's journal, Transactions, most of which reveal his deep knowledge of the Classical Chinese used in pre-modern Korea. His deep affection for the traditional culture of Korea, which had in fact almost ceased to exist by the time he arrived, was particularly expressed in his very popular volume, Korean Works and Days: Notes from the Diary of a Country Priest. One of his notable works of scholarship, apart from his translations, was his annotated edition (RASKB, 1972 / 1983) of the History of the Korean People by James Scarth Gale (first published in 1927) which includes a researched biography of the author. Like Gale, Rutt was fascinated by Classical Chinese and, after his retirement, he published a new translation of a challenging ancient Chinese classic, The Book of Changes, in 1996. He later assisted the historical research of the Anglican priest Roger Tennant as well as co-authoring the encyclopaedia Korea: A Historical and Cultural Dictionary with Keith Pratt. He was a member of both the Association of Korean Studies in Europe (AKSE) founded by William E. Skillend of SOAS and the British Association for Korean Studies (BAKS). In particular, Rutt was fascinated by traditional and formal sijo and older forms of Korean poetry in general. He owned a large collection of books related to Korea, including some rare Korean volumes, which he donated to the Bodleian Library at Oxford University.

Knitting
Rutt developed a passionate interest in knitting and authored a history of the craft in A History of Hand Knitting (Batsford, 1987). His collection of books about knitting is now housed at the Winchester School of Art (University of Southampton). Rutt was involved with the Knitting & Crochet Guild since its inception in 1978 and was its president at the time of his death.

Personal life
Rutt married Joan Ford (3 April 1919 – 17 September 2007) in Hong Kong in May 1969.  He was a bard of the Cornish Gorseth. His Korean name was Tae-yŏng No.

Selected works
In a statistical overview derived from writings by and about Rutt, OCLC/WorldCat encompasses roughly 30+ works in 70+ publications in three languages and 3,000+ library holdings

 2002 — Martyrs of Korea
 1999 — Korea: A Historical and Cultural Dictionary(with Keith L. Pratt)
 1996 — The Book of Changes (Zhouyi): A Bronze Age Document
 1987 — A History of Hand Knitting
 1980 — A Nine Cloud Dream by Man-jung Kim
 1974 — Virtuous Women: Three Classic Korean Novels
 1972 — History of the Korean People (James Scarth Gale)
 1971 — The Bamboo Grove: An Introduction to Sijo
 1964 — Korean Works and Days: Notes from the Diary of a Country Priest
 1958 — An Introduction to the Sijo, a Form of Short Korean Poem
 1956 — The Church Serves Korea

References

1925 births
2011 deaths
Alumni of Pembroke College, Cambridge
Anglican bishops of Daejeon
Bishops of St Germans
Bishops of Leicester
Anglican bishop converts to Roman Catholicism
Bards of Gorsedh Kernow
Commanders of the Order of the British Empire
Koreanists
20th-century Church of England bishops
Korean bishops
Alumni of Kelham Theological College